The German word Müller means "miller" (as a profession). It is the most common family surname in Germany, Switzerland, and the French départements of Bas-Rhin and Moselle (with the spelling Müller, Mueller or Muller) and is the fifth most common surname in Austria (see List of most common surnames in Europe). Other forms are "Miller" (mainly Southern Germany, Austria and Switzerland) and "Möller" (Northern and Central Germany and The Netherlands). Of the various family coats of arms that exist, many incorporate milling iconography, such as windmills or watermill wheels.

Number by country

A–F
Achim Müller (born 1938), German chemist
Adam Müller (1779–1829), German political economist and theorist of the state
Adolf Müller (industrialist) (1857–1932), Croatian industrialist, manufacturer and entrepreneur
Alfred Müller (disambiguation), multiple people
Andy Müller-Maguhn (born 1971), German computer expert (Chaos Computer Club)
Andreas Müller (1811–1890), German painter.
Arnold Müller (1884–1934), Austrian entomologist who was born and spent his life in what is now Romania. 
Axel Müller (born 1996), Uruguayan football player
Axel Müller (born 1963), German politician
Baal Müller (born 1969), German writer and publisher
Bettina Müller (born 1959), German politician
Carsten Müller (born 1970), German politician
Caroline Müller (mezzo-soprano) (1755–1826), Danish/Swedish mezzo-soprano, singer, actress
Caroline Müller (born 1964), Dutch-German pop-singer, known as C. C. Catch
Cecília Müller (born 1958), Hungarian physician
Claudia Müller (born 1981), German politician
Detlef Müller (born 1964), German politician
Dieter Müller (born 1954), German football player
Dirk Müller (disambiguation), several persons
Eduard Müller (disambiguation), several persons
Erwin Wilhelm Müller (1911–1977), German physicist
Filinto Müller (1900–1973), Brazilian politician and police chief
Filip Müller (1922–2013), Holocaust survivor
Frank Müller (born 1968), German decathlete
Friedrich Müller (disambiguation), several persons
Fritz Müller (1821–1897), German-born Brazilian naturalist
Fritz Müller (doctor) (1834–1895), Swiss doctor, zoologist, and herpetologist
Fritz Müller (rugby player), German rugby union international

G–H
Gebhard Müller (1990-1990), German lawyer and politician (CDU)
George Müller (1805–1898), Christian benefactor and missionary
Georg Elias Müller (1850–1934), German experimental psychologist
Gerd Müller (disambiguation), name of several persons
Gerhard Friedrich Müller (1705–1783), Russian historian of German descent
Gerhard Ludwig Müller (born 1947), German cardinal
Gilles Müller (born 1983), Luxembourgian professional tennis player
Günter Müller (born 1954), German jazz percussionist
Gustav Müller (disambiguation)
Hanno Müller-Brachmann (born 1970), German baritone
Hans Müller (disambiguation), name of several persons
Hansjörg Müller (born 1968), German politician
Heiner Müller (1929–1995), German dramatist
Heinrich Müller (Gestapo) (1900–1945), German Nazi official, wartime Gestapo chief
Heinrich Müller (physiologist) (1820–1864), German physiologist
Henri Müller, French curler
Herbert Müller (racing driver) (1940–1981), Swiss race car driver
Hermann Müller (disambiguation), name of several persons
Herta Müller (born 1953), Romanian-born German novelist and poet who won the Nobel Prize in Literature

I–K
Inge Müller (1925–1966), German poet
Jaroslav Müller, Czech swimmer
Jens Müller (pilot) (1917–1999), Norwegian World War II pilot, POW and survivor of the "Great Escape" from Stalag Luft III
Jens Müller (luger) (born 1965), German luger
Jochum Nicolay Müller (1775–1848), Danish (Norwegian) Naval officer
Joel Müller (1827–1895), German rabbi
Joël Müller (born 1952), former football player and manager, currently working as a technical director for FC Metz
Johann Gotthard von Müller (1747–1830), German engraver, and his son, Johann Friedrich Wilhelm Müller (1782–1816), engraver
Johann Heinrich Jakob Müller (1809–1875), German physicist
Johannes Müller (disambiguation), several persons
Jörg Müller (born 1969), German race car driver
Jörg Müller (cyclist) (born 1961), Swiss track cyclist and road bicycle racer
Josef Müller (CSU politician) (1898–1979), German politician and resistance member
Josef Müller (entomologist) (1880–1964), Croatian entomologist
Julius Müller (disambiguation), several people
Julius Müller (theologian) (1801–1878), German Protestant theologian
Jürgen Müller (born 1963), German neurologist and forensic psychiatrist
Karl Müller (astronomer) (1866–1942), Czechoslovakian government official and amateur astronomer
Karl Alexander Müller (1927–2023), Swiss physicist, 1987 Nobel Prize in Physics
Karl H. Müller (born 1953), Austrian social scientist
Karl Otfried Müller (1797–1840), German scholar of Spartan culture
Karl Wilhelm Ludwig Müller (1813–1894), German scholar of ancient Greek geography
Karl von Müller (1873–1923), German naval officer, captain of SMS Emden
Klaus Müller (disambiguation), name of several persons
Kurt Müller (footballer) (born 1948), Swiss international footballer
Klaus Uwe Müller (1915–1989), German chess player

L–O
Lauro Müller (1863–1926), Brazilian politician, diplomat, and military engineer
Lena Müller (born 1987), German rower
Leo Müller (1894–1941), Croatian industrialist and philanthropist killed during the Holocaust
Leopold Müller (engineer) (1908–1988), Austrian tunneling engineer
Leopold Müller (painter) (1834–1892), Austrian genre painter
Lillian Müller (born 1951), Norwegian model and actress
Lorenz Müller, (1868–1953), German herpetologist
Lucian Müller (1836–1898), German classical scholar
Ludwig Müller (disambiguation), several persons
Maler Müller (1749–1825), German poet, dramatist and painter, really Friedrich Müller
Malik Müller (born 1994), German basketball player
Margit Müller (born 1952), German field hockey player
Maria Müller (1898–1958), Austrian soprano
Martin Müller (disambiguation), several people
Martina Müller (footballer) (born 1980), German footballer
Martina Müller (tennis), (born 1982), German professional tennis player
Matthias Müller (disambiguation), several persons
Maurice Edmond Müller (1918–2009), Swiss orthopedic surgeon
Max Müller (disambiguation), several people
Müller (footballer) (born 1966), Brazilian footballer nicknamed Müller
Niclas Müller (1809–1875), German-American poet
Norbert Müller (born 1986), German politician
Norman Müller (born 1985), German decathlete
Otto Müller (1898–1979), German artist
Otto Friedrich Müller (1730–1784), Danish naturalist

P–Z
Paul Heinrich Theodor Müller (1896–?), German SS-Obersturmführer and Schutzhaftlagerführer
Paul Hermann Müller (1899–1965), Swiss chemist, 1948 Nobel Prize in Medicine
Patrick Müller (disambiguation), several people
Peter Müller (disambiguation), several people
Philipp Ludwig Statius Müller (1725–1776), German zoologist
Renate Müller (1906–1937), German actress
Richard Müller (singer) (born 1961), Slovak singer and musician
Robert Müller (1980–2009), German ice hockey player
Rosmarie Müller (born 1958), Swiss long-distance runner
Salomon Müller (1804–1864), German naturalist
Sándor Müller, Hungarian footballer
Sepp Müller (born 1989), German politician
Silke Müller (born 1978), German field hockey player
Sophie Müller (1803–1830), German and Austrian stage actress
Stefan Müller (born 1975), German politician
Susanne Müller (born 1972), German field hockey player
Theo Müller (born 1940), German businessman
Thomas Müller (disambiguation), several people
Torsten Müller (agroscientist) (born 1961), German agroscientist
 (born 1957), German musician
Urban Müller, Swiss computer programmer, creator of the brainfuck programming language
Vincenz Müller (1894–1961), German soldier and politician
Vít Müller, Czech athlete
Vladimir Müller (1880–before 1943), Russian lexicographer and medieval dramaturgy scholar
Walter Andreas Müller (born 1945), Swiss actor and comedian
Walther Müller (1905–1979), German physicist
Walther Otto Müller (1833–1887), German botanist
Wenzel Müller (1767–1835), Austrian composer
Werner Müller (politician) (1946–2019), German businessman and politician, Federal Minister for Economic Affairs and Energy from 1998 to 2002, CEO of RAG AG
Wilhelm Müller (1794–1827), German poet
William James Müller (1812–1845), English artist
Wolfgang Müller von Königswinter (1816–1873), German novelist and poet
Wolfgang Müller (1931–2021), German equestrian
Wolfgang Philipp Müller (born 1966), German founder of VDM Publishing
Xeno Müller (born 1972), Swiss rower

See also 
Moeller (surname)
Mueller
Muller
Müller (disambiguation)

References

German-language surnames
Occupational surnames